Alain Gay-Hardy (born 23 December 1949) is a French former footballer and manager.

Career

Playing career

Gay-Hardy started his career with French third tier side Quevilly-Rouen, helping them reach the semi-finals of the 1967–68 Coupe de France. In 195

Managerial career

In 1981, Gay-Hardy was appointed manager of AC Avignon in the French third tier, where he suffered relegation to the French fourth tier. In 1985, he was appointed manager of French sixth tier club Carpentras, helping them earn promotion to the French fifth tier. In 2008, Gay-Hardy was appointed manager of Liberia in the Costa Rican top flight, helping them win their only league title.

References

External links
 

1949 births
AC Avignonnais players
Amiens SC players
Championnat de France Amateur (1935–1971) players
Expatriate football managers in Costa Rica
French football managers
French footballers
Ligue 2 players
Living people
US Quevilly-Rouen Métropole players